Leon Kirchner (January 24, 1919 – September 17, 2009) was an American composer of contemporary classical music. He was a member of the American Academy of Arts and Letters and the American Academy of Arts and Sciences, and he won a Pulitzer Prize for his String Quartet No. 3.

Life and career
Kirchner was born in Brooklyn, New York. He began his music studies at the age of four. Five years later, his family moved to Los Angeles. He began composing while a student at Los Angeles City College. With the encouragement of his piano teachers and Ernst Toch, he entered the University of California, Los Angeles to study with Arnold Schoenberg. Kirchner began graduate studies at the University of California, Berkeley and was awarded the George Ladd Prix de Paris in 1942. As World War II put Europe in turmoil, he went to New York and studied with Roger Sessions. At the war's end, he returned to Berkeley as a lecturer and assisted Sessions and Ernest Bloch in theory.

Kirchner held a Slee Professiorship at the University of Buffalo (succeeding Aaron Copland), and professorships at the University of California, University of Southern California, Yale University, the Juilliard School of Music, and Mills College, where he was the first Luther Brusie Marchant Professor from 1954 to 1961. In 1961 he moved to Harvard University, where in 1966 he succeeded Walter Piston as Walter Bigelow Rosen Professor of Music and taught until 1989. He won the Pulitzer Prize for Music in 1967 for his Quartet No. 3.

According to Alexander Ringer, he "remained consistently individual, unimpressed by changing fashion where 'idea, the precious ore of art, is lost in the jungle of graphs, prepared tapes, feedbacks and cold stylistic minutiae'."

Kirchner married Gertrude Schoenberg, a singer and student of Arnold Schoenberg (no relation), on July 8, 1949; they had one son and one daughter. In 2009 he died of congestive heart failure at his home on Central Park West in New York City. He was 90.

References

Kennedy, Michael (2006). The Oxford Dictionary of Music. Oxford and New York: Oxford University Press.  .
Newlin, Dika. (1980) Schoenberg Remembered: Diaries and Recollections, 1938–1976. New York: Pendragon Press. .
Riggs, Robert. 2010. Leon Kirchner: Composer, Performer, and Teacher. Rochester, New York: University of Rochester Press.
Ringer, Alexander L. 2001. "Kirchner, Leon". The New Grove Dictionary of Music and Musicians, second edition, edited by Stanley Sadie and John Tyrrell. London: Macmillan Publishers.
Tommasini, Anthony. "Leon Kirchner, Composer and Teacher, Dies at 90", New York Times (September 18, 2009).
Wakin, Daniel J. "Remembering Leon Kirchner, Who Made Music Heard at Harvard". New York Times. Arts Beat blog (October 13, 2009, 5:43 pm)

Further reading
Swart, Inette. 2007. "Leon Kirchner's For the Left Hand: Effective Styles of Writing with Specific Reference to the Use of the Octatonic Scale". Musicus 35, no. 2:110–15.

External links

Recordings and videos of Leon Kirchner's compositions from the Isabella Stewart Gardner Museum
Leon Kirchner papers, 1939–2009 Music Division, New York Public Library for the Performing Arts.
Biography and list of compositions from Wise Music Classical
 
Interview with Leon Kirchner, December 16, 1990

1919 births
2009 deaths
American male classical composers
American classical composers
Jewish American classical composers
Pulitzer Prize for Music winners
Pupils of Arnold Schoenberg
Pupils of Roger Sessions
20th-century classical composers
20th-century American composers
20th-century American male musicians
Music & Arts artists
University at Buffalo faculty